Piotr Robakowski (born 1 May 1990) is a Polish former professional footballer who played as a defender.

External links
 

1990 births
People from Wejherowo
Sportspeople from Pomeranian Voivodeship
Living people
Polish footballers
Association football defenders
Arka Gdynia players
Radomiak Radom players
Gwardia Koszalin players
Ekstraklasa players
II liga players
III liga players